Fung Shue Wo is a basin in north Tsing Yi Island, Hong Kong. The old villages in the basin have now been replaced by relocated villages from the basin and nearby, including Tsing Yi Hui, Tsing Yu New Village and Fung Shue Wo Tsuen.

References 

Tsing Yi